Gabriele Rauscher  (born 20 November 1970) is a German freestyle skier. She was born in Münsingen in Baden-Württemberg. She competed at the 1998 Winter Olympics, in women's moguls.

References

External links 
 

1970 births
People from Münsingen, Germany
Sportspeople from Tübingen (region)
Living people
German female freestyle skiers
Olympic freestyle skiers of Germany
Freestyle skiers at the 1998 Winter Olympics
20th-century German women